The Bangladesh Fire Service & Civil Defence (FSCD) is an emergency service that operates under the Security Services Division of the Ministry of Home Affairs in the People's Republic of Bangladesh. The department's primary objective is to provide critical public safety services to the people of Bangladesh, including fire protection, emergency medical care, and other essential services. It had received the Independence Day Award, the highest civilian award in Bangladesh, for public service in 2023.

In addition to responding to emergencies, the FSCD is committed to educating the public on fire safety, life safety, and disaster preparedness. Through public awareness campaigns and other educational initiatives, the department works to promote community safety and preparedness, with the aim of reducing the incidence of emergencies and minimizing their impact on society.

The FSCD plays a vital role in ensuring public safety in Bangladesh. Its emergency response functions and public education programs have helped to mitigate the risks of fires and other disasters, contributing to the country's social and economic development. The department's unwavering commitment to public safety has made it an essential asset to the country, and its efforts have helped to save countless lives and prevent catastrophic losses.  It had received the Independence Day Award, the highest civilian award in Bangladesh, for Social Services/Public Services category in 2023.

Organisation 
 The Bangladesh Fire Service and Civil Defense (FSCD) is organized into several departments, including operations, maintenance, training, planning, development, administration, and finance. These departments work together to provide comprehensive emergency services to the public.

During times of emergency, the FSCD also receives support from civilian volunteers, who provide additional assistance to the department. As of 2022, there were approximately 48,000 civilian volunteers registered with the FSCD.

Operation

Firefighting operations
Fire suppression
Technical rescue
Hazardous materials mitigation 
Airport fire and rescue
Seaport fire and rescue
Fire prevention
Inspection of buildings
Hazardous materials safety measures
Fire prevention inspection
Fire protection management guidance
Fire investigation
Emergency medical services
First-aid education and training
Emergency telephone consultation

Staffing 
The department currently has over 13,058 employees. In addition to the director general, there are three directors, nine deputy directors, twenty assistant directors, and eighty deputy assistant directors.

Station
The department operates from a total of 493 fire stations dispersed throughout the country. 
92 (A category stations)
286 (B category stations)
4 (B category land cum river stations)
100 (C category stations)
11 (River fire stations)
These stations serve as crucial response points in times of fire-related emergencies and enable the department to efficiently carry out its operations.

History 

The then British government created Fire Service in 1939–40 in undivided India. 
During the Partition, the Calcutta Fire Service was created for the city of Calcutta at the regional level and the Bengal Fire Service for undivided Bengal. In 1947, the fire service in the region was renamed the East Pakistan Fire Service. 

During World War II, the Department of Civil Defense in India was initially created with Air Raid Precautions (ARP) at an early stage and the Department of Civil Defense at a later stage in 1951 through legal process. For the purpose of work management, a Rescue Department was created under the Roads and Highways Department.

On April 9, 1981, the then Fire Service Directorate and the Civil Defense Department merged to form the Department of Fire Service and Civil Defense. Later the Rescue Department was included in the Department of Fire Service & Civil Defence. The FSCD is currently 40 years old.

Rank structure 
Director General
Director 
Deputy Director / Principal
Assistant Director / Vice Principal
Deputy Assistant Director / Instructor / Senior Staff officer / PO cum Adjutant 
Senior Station Officer / Assistant Instructor / Officer in charge / Store Officer
Warehouse Inspector
Station Officer / Staff officer / Junior Instructor / Mobilizing Officer
Sub Officer
Leader 
Firefighter / Nursing attendant / Diver

Driver

Equipment

In popular culture 
Aguner Nona Jol is a Bangladeshi drama that provides a dramatized portrayal of the Bangladesh Fire Service & Civil Defence (FSCD) from the perspective of a fictional Senior Station Officer (SSO). The drama features renowned actors Riaz and Rumana Rashid Ishita, and was directed by Hamed Hasan Noman. Notably, members of the FSCD also served as actors and advisers for the production, providing technical expertise and guidance to ensure that the portrayal of the emergency service was accurate and authentic. Through its depiction of the SSO's experiences, Aguner Nona Jol seeks to provide insight into the challenges faced by members of the FSCD in their mission to protect public safety and respond to emergencies.

References

Government agencies of Bangladesh
Emergency services in Bangladesh
1982 establishments in Bangladesh
Government agencies established in 1982
Recipients of the Independence Day Award